A Million Voices may refer to:
 A Million Voices (charity), a charity organisation based in Arendal, Norway, but operating in Manila, Philippines
 "A Million Voices" (song), Russia's entry in the Eurovision Song Contest 2015, performed by Polina Gagarina
 "Million Voices", a 2012 single by Otto Knows